The Buffalo Niagara Region is an economic region that is part of the Great Lakes region of North America, comprising much of Western New York in the United States. The Regional Institute of the University at Buffalo has defined the region as including the eight westernmost counties in New York.

The 8 counties in the region, as defined by Invest Buffalo Niagara, are:

 Allegany County, New York
 Cattaraugus County, New York
 Chautauqua County, New York
 Erie County, New York
 Genesee County, New York
 Niagara County, New York
 Orleans County, New York
 Wyoming County, New York

See also

 Western New York
 Southern Ontario
 Niagara Peninsula
 Holland Purchase
 Finger Lakes
 Southern Tier
 Central New York
 Golden Horseshoe

References

Regions of New York (state)
Great Lakes